Ifeanyi is surname and given name of Igbo origin which means "nothing is impossible with God"

Notable people 
Ifeanyi Allen (born 1994), English footballer
Ifeanyi Ararume, elected Senator for the Imo North (Okigwe) constituency of Imo State, Nigeria
Ifeanyi Chiejine (born 1983), Nigerian football striker
Ifeanyi Chijindu, Nigerian-American author/writer, entrepreneur, artist, actress and screenwriter
Ifeanyi Edeh (born 1996), Nigerian professional footballer
Ifeanyi Emeghara (born 1984), Nigerian football player
Arthur Okowa Ifeanyi (born 1959), elected Senator for Delta North, in Delta State, Nigeria
Dumaka Francis Ifeanyi (born 1989), Nigerian football player
Edwin Ifeanyi (born 1972), former Cameroonian football player
Israel Ifeanyi, former American Football defensive end
Ifeanyi Menkiti (born 1940), a Nigerian poet, and philosophy professor at Wellesley College
Ifeanyi Momah (born 1989), American football Tight End
Matthew Ifeanyi Nwagwu, elected Senator for the Imo North constituency of Imo State, Nigeria
Ifeanyi Ohalete (born 1979), former American football strong safety in National Football League
Digger Ifeanyi Okonkwo (born 1977), former Maltese footballer of Igbo Nigerian origin
Ifeanyi Frederick Onuigbo (born 1989), Nigerian footballer, currently playing as a striker
Ifeanyi Onyilo (born 1990), Nigerian football player
Ifeanyi Uddin or Adokiye Amiesimaka (born 1956), Nigerian footballer
Ifeanyi Udeze (born 1980), Nigerian football player
Ifeanyi Festus Ezeli-Ndulue (born 1989), Nigerian National Basketball Association Player